was a politician of Ryukyuan descent who was active in Taiwan and Okinawa. He spent all his life seeking an independent Ryukyu; if could not reach that goal, he preferred to return to the Republic of China (aka Taiwan) rather than Japan. He was also known by his Chinese style name, Tsai Chang (sound as "Sai Shō" in Japanese).

Kiyuna was born in Honolulu, Hawaii, United States. His ancestor was Sai Ken, a Chinese immigrant from Nan'an, Quanzhou, Fujian. As a child, Kiyuna had lived in Southeast Asia and Saipan together with his father for several years. He attended Ryukyu Marine Production School. After his graduation, Kiyuna became a marine production engineer worked in Okinawa in 1933.

Kiyuna worked as a newspaper editor in Hawaii since 1935. He came to Okinawa in 1941, set up a party named Young Ryukyuan Comrade Association secretly to fight for the Ryukyu independence. He came to Taiwan in 1943, and became an officer in General-Government of Taiwan.

Japan surrendered in 1945, the Ryukyu Islands was taken over by United States, and Taiwan was reoccupied by China. Young Ryukyuan Comrade Association changed its name to Ryukyuan Revolution Comrade Association, and registered in Keelung. The party's ideology was very similar to Kuomintang. He started a petition to Chiang Kai-shek in 1947, said that "Ryukyu should be independent, or return to China". He came back to Okinawa frequently, seeking an independent Ryukyu, and was supported by Chiang Kai-shek. He was also very active in Taiwan, and was selected as "senator of Taiwan province" in 1948. A twin party named Ryukyuan Nationalist Party was registered at Naha in 1958, he was selected as the vice chairman and Minister of Foreign Affairs.

After the return of Okinawa to Japanese control, he came back to Naha, to promote the independent Ryukyu, but few people supported him. He died there in 1989.

Footnotes

References
 何義麟、戰後在臺琉球人之居留與認同
 比嘉康文 『沖縄独立』の系譜　琉球国を夢見た6人 紹介

1916 births
1989 deaths
People from Okinawa Prefecture
Politics of Okinawa
Politics of Taiwan
Ryukyuan people
Ryukyu independence activists
American people of Japanese descent
Japanese people of Chinese descent
People from Honolulu
20th-century Ryukyuan people